Rasbora laticlavia is a species of ray-finned fish in the genus Rasbora from Kalimantan in Indonesia.

References

Rasboras
Freshwater fish of Borneo
Taxa named by Darrell J. Siebert
Taxa named by Philippa J. Richardson
Fish described in 1997